Penne alla vodka is a pasta dish made primarily with vodka and penne pasta (or similar shapes such as rigatoni), usually accompanied with heavy cream, crushed tomatoes or tomato sauce, onions, and sometimes small meats and vegetables like sausage, pancetta or peas. The pure alcohol apparently helps intensify and accentuate flavors in the dish, among other claims. 

The recipe became very popular in Italy and in the United States around the 1980s, when it was offered to discotheque customers. The recipe thus became an icon of the fashionable cuisine of the time, which preferred the use of cream in first courses. Penne alla vodka remains popular in Italian-American cuisine.

Origins

The exact origins of penne alla vodka are unclear, and to some extent the subject of urban legend and folklore. 

The first use of vodka in a pasta dish is attested to in 1974, when the Italian actor Ugo Tognazzi published the cookbook L'Abbuffone (means "the bouffe-men", named after Tognazzi's movie La Grande Bouffe), which included his recipe of pasta all'infuriata ('furious pasta'), described as a sort of pasta all'arrabbiata, made with ½ kg of penne, ½ kg of fresh peeled tomatoes, a shot of vodka, chili pepper, oil, garlic, and bay leaves. Tognazzi suggested also that, if using a Polish vodka with chilli ("formidable, tremendous, very strong, very hot, deadly"), the fresh chilli pepper can be omitted.

There have been multiple, often conflicting, claims to the invention and history of the dish; one author claims that it was invented at Dante, a restaurant in Bologna. One cookbook claims that it was invented in the 1980s by a Roman chef for a vodka company that wanted to popularize its product in Italy. The dish may have been common in Italy before becoming popular in America in the early 1980s.

In the 1980s, another recipe based on penne and vodka, called penne alla moscovita (penne on Moscow style), but made with smoked salmon, cream and caviar (or variant with cream and shrimp), became very popular. Because of the particularity and novelty of the recipe compared to traditional Italian cuisine, it was widespread in the discos of the Emilia-Romagna Riviera with the generic name of "penne alla vodka".

On October 25, 2016, the Italian Association of Confectionery and Pasta Industries rediscovered this recipe from the 1980s, proposing it again on the occasion of the 18th edition of the World Pasta Day organized in Moscow, as symbol of friendship between Italy and Russia. The initiative was successful, so much so that research in the U.S. has shown that penne alla vodka has become the second most sought-after dish of pasta in search engines, behind only pasta alla Bolognese.

Composition

Along with the penne pasta, this dish generally contains cream sauce mixed with marinara sauce or tomato paste, which are a combination unusual in Italian cooking because the acidity of the tomatoes tends to make the oil in the cream separate. The ethanol (vodka) serves as an emulsifier, allowing the water and lipids to remain mixed together.

Ethanol is also thought to solvate certain flavors from the tomato that would otherwise be inaccessible in water. This is seen in other vodka sauces, as well.

In media

Film
 Disco Sauce: The True Story of Penne Alla Vodka is a platinum Viddy, Platinum MarCom and Taste Award winning documentary released in 2022 by director Roberto Serrini that examines the history, composition, and variations of penne alla vodka. The film features chef Pasquale Cozzolino, chef Gaetano Arnone, chef Jae Lee, chef JJ Johnson, chef Jeremy Spector, and molecular gastronomist Herve This.

See also

 List of pasta dishes
 Italian-American cuisine
 Pink sauce

References

Pasta dishes
Italian-American cuisine